Joplin Township is an inactive township in Jasper County, in the U.S. state of Missouri.

Joplin Township takes its name from the city of Joplin.

References

Townships in Missouri
Townships in Jasper County, Missouri